Technical Ecstasy is the seventh studio album by English heavy metal band Black Sabbath, produced by guitarist Tony Iommi and released on 25 September 1976 by Vertigo Records. The album received mixed reviews from critics but was a commercial success, peaking at number 13 on the UK Albums Chart and number 51 on the US Billboard 200 Album chart, later being certified Gold by the RIAA in 1997.

Composition and recording
After frustrating legal battles that accompanied the recording of 1975's Sabotage, Sabbath chose Miami's Criteria Studios for the making of Technical Ecstasy, which continued the band's separation from the doom and darkness that had been a trademark of their earlier albums. "Some people may have heard the band in 1970", noted Iommi, "and be thinking, 'Oh no, not them again!' But if they heard us now, they probably might like us."

In the July 2001 issue of Guitar World, Dan Epstein wrote, "The sessions proved extremely relaxing for everyone except Iommi, who was left to oversee the production while the others sunned themselves on the beach." Iommi explained to the same magazine in 1992, "We recorded the album in Miami, and nobody would take responsibility for the production. No one wanted to bring in an outside person for help, and no one wanted the whole band to produce it. So they left it all to me!"

In the liner notes to the band's 1998 live album Reunion, Phil Alexander writes that, while the band struggled to finish the album, "rock had spawned a new set of iconoclasts as the Sex Pistols, the Clash and the Damned… Suddenly Sabbath found themselves both unsure of their musical direction and labeled as has-beens." "It's not like now: If you're a heavy metal band, you put out a heavy metal album", Butler explained to Uncut in 2014. "Back then, you had to at least try to be modern and keep up. Punk was massive then and we felt that our time had come and gone."

To make matters worse for the band, manager Don Arden began spending more of his time focusing on another of his acts, Electric Light Orchestra, whose 1975 album Face The Music was their first to make the US top ten. Iommi's determination to move Sabbath in a new direction was misguided according to some, with Mick Wall noting in the 2013 book Black Sabbath: Symptom of the Universe that while future soft rock million-sellers Hotel California and Rumours were just around the corner, "to try and force that sound on Black Sabbath was like trying to put lamb's wool on a suit of armour. It just didn't work, pleasing nobody."

In his autobiography I Am Ozzy, vocalist Ozzy Osbourne admitted he had begun to consider leaving the band during this time: "I'd even had a T-shirt made with 'Blizzard of Ozz' written on the front. Meanwhile, in the studio, Tony (Iommi) was always saying, 'We've gotta sound like Foreigner', or 'We've gotta sound like Queen.' But I thought it was strange that the bands we'd once influenced were now influencing us." Osbourne also wrote that the cost of recording in Florida "was astronomical" and that he'd "lost the plot with the booze and the drugs" during the recording of Technical Ecstasy, eventually checking himself into the Stafford County Asylum on his return to England.

"That was the beginning of the end, that one", bassist Geezer Butler confessed to Guitar World in 2001. "We were managing ourselves because we couldn't trust anybody. Everybody was trying to rip us off, including the lawyers we'd hired to get us out of our legal mess. It was really just getting to us around then, and we didn't know what we were doing. And obviously, the music was suffering; you could just feel the whole thing falling apart."

While the band were recording the album, The Eagles were recording Hotel California in an adjacent studio at Criteria Studios in Miami. "Before we could start recording we had to scrape all the cocaine out of the mixing board", Geezer divulged to Uncut in 2014. "I think they'd left about a pound of cocaine in the board." The Eagles were forced to stop recording on numerous occasions because Sabbath were too loud and the sound was coming through the wall.

Technical Ecstasys lyrics dealt with a variety of topics. Tony Iommi's autobiography Iron Man: My Journey Through Heaven & Hell with Black Sabbath reveals that "Dirty Women" was about "all these hookers" Butler had seen around Florida. "All Moving Parts (Stand Still)" is about "a transvestite who becomes President of the United States", Butler told biographer Mick Wall in 2013, "because America was such a misogynistic society at the time." As with their previous two albums, the band continued experimenting with keyboards and synthesisers on Technical Ecstasy. The music itself was less dark and more atypical than that of previous albums, especially on the ballads "It's Alright" and "She's Gone".

The ballad "It's Alright" was written and sung by drummer Bill Ward. Initially reluctant to sing the song for fear of offending Osbourne, he was encouraged by the band to do it. In his autobiography, Osbourne praises the performance, enthusing, "He's got a great voice, Bill, and I was more than happy for him to do the honours." It was released as a single because, said Iommi, "We want to break out as far as we can… so we've decided to hit the singles market." It has since been covered live by Guns N' Roses, and was included on their Live Era '87–'93 album. It was also featured in the 2010 film It's Kind of a Funny Story.

Artwork
The cover art was designed by Hipgnosis. Osbourne once described it as "two robots screwing on an escalator". Hipgnosis' Storm Thorgerson, who had been assisted by graphic designer George Hardie, discussed the cover with Zoom magazine in 1979: "We're very fond of that cover. From the title of the piece, Technical Ecstasy, I thought of something ecstatic rather than something technical, and I immediately thought of ecstasy in sexual terms: some sort of mechanical copulation, which would be tricky to do. I then thought of ecstasy as falling in love, perhaps during a brief encounter on an escalator – and, since it was 'technical', I thought of two robots ... It's really quite simple – he's just done curves for the female and hard, angular, macho lines for the male. It's really quite sexist, actually – stereotyped. Anyway, it's love at first sight, but I felt robots wouldn't do it like humans would do it, so instead they're squirting lubricating fluid at one another." The UK release had a two-sided insert of lyrics and credits.

Tour
During the subsequent 1977 European tour in support of Technical Ecstasy, the band was supported by AC/DC. The relationship between bassist Geezer Butler and AC/DC rhythm guitarist Malcolm Young was quite tense. Guitarist Tony Iommi recalls the atmosphere between the two being "heavy" and that the pair did not get along at all. Ward's drum tech Graham Wright and Osbourne's personal assistant David Tangye stated in their 2004 book How Black Was Our Sabbath that the problems between the two originated after a show the two bands performed earlier in Switzerland. An altercation occurred in an hotel bar in which Butler removed a switch-blade comb from his pocket and opened it. Young thought it was a switchblade knife and believed Butler was pointing it at him. In the Bon Scott biography Highway To Hell: The Life and Times of AC/DC Legend Bon Scott, Clinton Walker writes of the tour: "Sabbath, by 1976, were well past their prime, and AC/DC were all but blowing them right off the stage. Substance abuse in the band was rampant." Graham and Tangye also disclose that during the tour drummer Ward had begun driving from gig to gig in a rented Winnebago due to a fear of flying.

Osbourne briefly left following the Technical Ecstasy Tour. Although he would eventually return for the follow-up Never Say Die!, the band temporarily replaced him with former Savoy Brown vocalist Dave Walker. The band wrote a handful of songs with Walker, and performed an early version of what would become "Junior's Eyes" on the BBC programme Look Hear with him.

Reception

The album received mixed reviews, with Phil Alexander writing in 1998, "While today hardcore Sabs fans defend some of the bold steps taken on Technical Ecstasy, it was a confused offering which still hit Number 13 in the UK but limped into the US charts at 52." In 2001, Guitar World was less kind, calling it perhaps the "least-loved effort of the original lineup" with the band "trying to stretch its sound in several different directions, none of them exceptionally successful." It deemed "Rock 'N' Roll Doctor" "a bad Kiss imitation" while eschewing "It's Alright" as "a sub-par Paul McCartney-style pop ballad." In 2013 Mojo magazine opined, "Technical Ecstasy is the sound of Sabbath trying to make a grown-up, radio-friendly rock record and, in some parts, it works ... Mostly, however, it doesn't with tracks like 'Back Street Kids', 'Rock 'N' Roll Doctor' and 'Dirty Women' resorting to clichéd and ill-fitting rock moves." Greg Prato of AllMusic agrees "it was not on par with Sabbath's exceptional first five releases", but praises "Dirty Women", the "funky" "All Moving Parts (Stand Still)" and the "raging opener" "Back Street Kids".

In 1992, Iommi admitted to Guitar World: "Black Sabbath fans generally don't like much of Technical Ecstasy. It was really a no-win situation for us. If we had stayed the same, people would have said we were still doing the same old stuff. So we tried to get a little more technical, and it just didn't work out very well."

Track listing

 The UK cassette version switches the tracks It's Alright and She's Gone. 
 Tracks 3 and 4 were swapped on some copies.
 Disc four of the 2021 Super Deluxe edition features a partial live recording of the band's performance on 8 December 1976 at the Civic Arena in Pittsburgh, Pennsylvania.

Personnel
Black Sabbath
 Tony Iommi – guitar
 Ozzy Osbourne – lead vocals
 Geezer Butler – bass
 Bill Ward – drums, lead vocals on "It's Alright"

Additional
 Gerald "Jezz" Woodroffe – keyboards (credited as "Gerald Woodruffe")

Charts

Release history

Certifications

References

External links
 
 What the hell happened to Technical Ecstasy?, an article about the album by music journalist Dan Marsicano

1976 albums
Albums with cover art by Hipgnosis
Black Sabbath albums
Vertigo Records albums
Warner Records albums